Shoot Out at Big Sag is a 1962 American Western film. It starred Walter Brennan and was made for Brennan's production company.

The film was produced by Brennan's son Andy and based on a story by Walter Coburn. It was meant to be a television pilot called Barbed Wire, and would have also starred Leif Erickson and Constance Ford. Shot in 1960, the pilot was to be called "Rawhide Halo".

The pilot was eventually released as a film. In Mexico the film was titled Los Magnificos McCoy as a tie-in to Walter Brennan's American television series The Real McCoys.

Plot summary
"Preacher" Hawker (Walter Brennan) is the pawn of his bossy wife Hannah (Luana Patten), who wants to start a range war with their neighbor Sam Barbee (Leif Erickson).  It doesn’t help that "Preacher"s' daughter and Barbee’s son have fallen in love. "Preacher" hires Chan Bartholomew (Les Tremayne), a lowlife saloon owner, to ensure that the outcome is in the Hawker family's favor.

Cast
Walter Brennan as "Preacher" Hawker
Leif Erickson as Sam Barbee
Luana Patten as Hannah Hawker
Chris Robinson as Lee Barbee
Constance Ford as 	Goldie Bartholomew
Virginia Gregg as Sarah Treadway Hawker
Les Tremayne as Chan Bartholomew
Don O'Kelly as	Fargo (as Donald O'Kelly)
 Andy Brennan as Townsman
Hal Needham as	Saloon Brawler (uncredited)
Buddy Roosevelt as	Barfly (uncredited)

References

External links
Shoot Out at Big Sag at IMDb
Shoot Out at Big Sag at TCMDB

1960s English-language films
1962 Western (genre) films
1962 films
American Western (genre) films
American black-and-white films
Television pilots not picked up as a series
1960s American films